Ernest Harmon may refer to:

 Ernest N. Harmon (1894–1979), United States Army general
 Ernest Emery Harmon (1893–1933), American aviation pioneer